Washington Township is a township in Linn County, Iowa.

History
Washington Township was organized in 1841.

References

Townships in Linn County, Iowa
Townships in Iowa
1841 establishments in Iowa Territory